Bogdan Adam Klich  (born on 8 May 1960 in Kraków) is a former Minister of National Defence of Poland. Son to Adam Klich. Bogdan Klich was interned in 1981 during the martial law set by the communist regime.  Until November 16, 2007, he was a Member of the European Parliament (MEP) for the Lesser Poland Voivodeship & Swietokrzyskie Voivodeship with the Civic Platform, part of the European People's Party and he sits on the European Parliament's Committee on Foreign Affairs. Senator since November 2011. Since 2002, Klich has been a lecturer at the Department of European Studies at Jagiellonian University. Lecturer at the Cracow University of Economics since the academic year 2013/2014. The author of numerous publications concerning foreign policy and international security.

Education
 1986: Physician, Kraków Medical Academy
 1987: Master's in the History of Art, Jagiellonian University (UJ)
 1991–1995: Doctoral studies, Department of Historical Philosophy

Political career

Career in national politics
 since 1997: President of the Institute of Strategic Studies
 2001–2004: Member of Parliament of the Republic of Poland, Vice-Chairman of the Committee on Foreign Affairs, member of the Committee on National Defence
 1989–1999: Advisor to the Chief Negotiator of the Republic of Poland with the European Union
 1999–2000: Deputy Minister for National Defence in the Republic of Poland
 2003–2004: Observer to the EP
 2001–2004: Polish representative and member of the Policy Committee of the Parliamentary Assembly of the Council of Europe

Member of the European Parliament, 2004–2007
A member of the European People's Party group, Kilch served on the Committee on Foreign Affairs. In addition to his committee assignments, he was a member of the Parliament's delegation for relations with Belarus.

Minister of Defence, 2007–2011
From 2007 until 2011, Klich served as Minister for National Defence in the Republic of Poland, in the government of Prime Minister Donald Tusk.

During his time in office, Klich implemented Tusk's campaign pledge to withdraw Poland's troops from Iraq. By October 2008, he marked the end of his country's five-year partnership with U.S. forces in Iraq; Poland had been the only country other than the United States and Britain to command a full division of foreign troops in Iraq, and contingents from several other countries initially served under Polish command in a broad area south of Baghdad.

Also under Klich's leadership, Poland and the United States signed a status of forces agreement (SOFA) that paved the way for the stationing of U.S. troops on Polish territory. Three months after the United States announced a reformulated missile-defense plan for Poland in 2010, Klich announced that an undisclosed number of American MIM-104 Patriot surface-to-air missiles would be deployed in the vicinity of Morąg, in northern Poland, just 35 miles from the Russian enclave of Kaliningrad.

On May 12, 2011, Klich announced that Poland would lead a new EU Battlegroup of the Visegrád Group.

In July 2011, Klich resigned after an official investigation into the 2010 Polish Air Force Tu-154 crash which killed President Lech Kaczyński and all 95 others on board, concluded that mistakes by the military pilots were the primary cause of the disaster. Prime Minister Tusk clarified that he did not hold Klich responsible for the crash, saying merely that the investigation had recommended swift and wholesale changes which could only be implemented by a new minister, Klich's deputy, Tomasz Siemoniak.

Member of the Senate, 2011-present
Klich has been a member of the Senate of Poland since the 2011 national elections and is currently the minority leader. He also serves as deputy chairman of the Senate's Committee on Foreign Affairs and as member of the Defence Committee.

In addition to his role in parliament, Klich has again been serving as a member of the Polish delegation to the Parliamentary Assembly of the Council of Europe since 2012. He serves on the Committee on Political Affairs and Democracy and on the Sub-Committee on the Middle East and the Arab World; in this capacity, he is also the Assembly's rapporteur on Morocco.

Since 2015, Klich has been serving as a member of the European Commission's High-level Group of Personalities on Defence Research, chaired by
Elżbieta Bieńkowska.

Other activities
 Member of the International Institute of Strategic Studies, London
 Lecturer at the Centre for European Studies at the Jagiellonian University

Decorations
 2010 - Medal "Milito Pro Christo" 
 2010 - Order of Merit, Ukraine
 2014 - Order of the Cross of Terra Mariana, Estonia
And more.

References

Publications

External links
 
 

1960 births
Living people
Politicians from Kraków
Ministers of National Defence of Poland
Jagiellonian University alumni
Lesser Poland Voivodeship
Civic Platform MEPs
MEPs for Poland 2004
MEPs for Poland 2004–2009
Members of the Senate of Poland 2011–2015
Members of the Senate of Poland 2015–2019
Members of the Senate of Poland 2019–2023
Recipients of the Order of the Cross of Terra Mariana, 2nd Class